Noble station is a station along the SEPTA West Trenton Line to Ewing, New Jersey. It is located at Old York Road & Rodman Avenue in the community of Noble in Abington Township, Pennsylvania. The station has off-street parking.  In FY 2013, Noble station had a weekday average of 222 boardings and 252 alightings.

History
Noble station was originally built in 1901 by the Reading Railroad, as a replacement for a former North Pennsylvania Railroad built in 1889 and dedicated by President Benjamin Harrison. It is the last stop inbound before Jenkintown-Wyncote station in Jenkintown, Pennsylvania, where it merges with the Warminster and Lansdale/Doylestown lines.

Station layout
Noble has two low-level side platforms.

Gallery

References

External links

SEPTA - Noble Station
 Station from Google Maps Street View

SEPTA Regional Rail stations
Former Reading Company stations
Railway stations in the United States opened in 1889
Railway stations in Montgomery County, Pennsylvania
1889 establishments in Pennsylvania